is a 12-episode OVA series from the Armored Trooper Votoms franchise that was released from 2007 to 2008. Set after the 1988 OVA movie The Red Shoulder Document: Roots of Ambition and months before the events of the VOTOMS television series, Pailsen Files explores the origins of Chirico Cuvie as explained by the Red Shoulder Battalion's now-disgraced commander, Col Yoran Pailsen.

The series is also notable for its use of 3D computer graphics, which have never been done in the history of the franchise.

Premise
A few weeks after the Gilgamesh Confederation's victory over the Balarant Union at the desert planet Sunsa, the Melkian Space Force High Command arrests Red Shoulder Battalion commander Col Yoran Pailsen. He undergoes a court-martial over his management of the now-disbanded unit and his obsession with the supposed Perfect Soldier, Chirico Cuvie.

After being the only survivor in a botched operation, Cuvie is evacuated and reassigned to a five-man team of AT pilots that are seemingly as invulnerable as him.

Episode list

Characters
Chirico Cuvie – A former member of the Red Shoulder Battalion, Cuvie is known for his uncanny ability to dive into extremely dangerous situations and always come out alive. By the time of the Pailsen Files, he has been reassigned back to the Army after the fiasco in Roots of Ambition. 
MSgt Noll Berkhoff – A 32-year-old AT pilot skilled in meteorology, Berkhoff was demoted to sergeant from first lieutenant for desertion before the events of the series. He redeems himself in the final episode by single-handedly taking on the Balarant. 
MSgt Dare Kochak – An obese 34-year-old man, Dare is ridiculed for his timidity and weight, but proves his worth in the operations at the Arctic base. 
MSgt Garry Godan – The burliest in the group, Godan is known for his vicious battle abilities. It is revealed that he killed comrades as they tried to escape the battlefield. 
Cpl Glenborash Droka Zaki – An artificially-created Perfect Soldier, Zaki is 16 years old. He was brainwashed to kill Chirico but commits suicide in the final episode. 
Col Yoran Pailsen – The former commander of the Red Shoulder Battalion. Pailsen is arrested based on the information Virgil Carson was able to send to the Gilgamesh military intelligence service during the events of Roots of Ambition. Over the course of the series, Pailsen explains the data in his Pailsen Files disk, but reveals that everything he shared is fake. 
Fedok Wockam – The undersecretary of the Melkian Information Ministry's Intelligence Department. Wockam is intrigued by reports of Chirico's infamous survival ability and interrogates Pailsen to learn more. 
Cotta Ruske – Wockam's deputy in the Intelligence Department. He kills Wockam in the final episode. His cryptic words in the finale imply that he is television series character Jean-Paul Rochina. , who is also the series narrator.
Sgt Maj Wapp – A non-commissioned officer at Galeade base M7, Wapp relishes putting the Berkhoff squad through hardships.

Releases

Home media
The episodes were released on six DVDs starting from October 26, 2007 until August 22, 2008. Each DVD package contains two episodes.

Movie version
Released on January 17, 2009, Armored Trooper VOTOMS: Pailsen Files The Movie is a feature-length version of the OVA series. The movie contains many of the series' important moments, plus new footage: 
An introductory scene where Red Shoulder Battalion Scopedog Turbo Custom ATs at their Odon base assemble in formation for Pailsen, who receives a Gilgamesh Army military police detail that serves him an arrest warrant. The Scopedogs draw their weapons at the arresting team, but Pailsen signals them to hold their fire, implying that he is turning himself in.
A closing scene where Chirico and Zaki's escape pod reaches an unknown planet, with a cover of the classic VOTOMS intro theme song Honoo No Sadame (Destiny of the Flames) playing in the background. After the pod crashes on the surface, Chirico buries Zaki and walks away.

Books
Armored Trooper Votoms Pailsen Files (novel) by Soji Yoshikawa, published by: Hobby Japan, released on January 17, 2009 
Pailsen Files Votoms VISUAL BOOK Published by: Hobby Japan, released on September 16, 2008

Toys/Models
TakaraTomy produced ATs from the series as part of its Actic Gear line of three-inch action figures. The Berkhoff squad Scopedogs are pre-packaged with the first five Pailsen Files DVDs while the sixth DVD contains a special Scopedog Turbo Custom painted in the dull gray colors of the Melkian Information Ministry's ISS special operations command. The other figures in the line include two-pack reissues of previously released units (such as the Scopedog, Fatty, and Diving Beetle with Spring Bobbin carpet track system), Wapp's Standing Tortoise, and the Berkhoff squad Scopedog Turbo Customs in ISS and arctic camouflage colors, plus an ISS Dog Carrier transport with free ISS Scopedog Turbo Custom. Each figure comes with a file card. The arctic camouflage units also have special snowshoe attachments.

Model kit companies Wave and Bandai also released kits of ATs as they appeared in the series.

Theme songs
Opening: Lullaby of Iron 
Ending: Bye-Bye Brother
Performed By: George Yanagi

Reception
Chris Guanche of Mecha and Anime HQ rated the movie at 4/5, stating that the absence of several scenes, including those of Yugunt and Fuller, improved the movie's pacing. He added that the concentration of important scenes can also be lessons for future Gundam compilation films

References

External links

Official website 

2007 anime OVAs
2009 anime films
2009 Japanese novels
Action anime and manga
Maiden Japan
Mecha anime and manga
Sunrise (company)